Awareness Records was a record label founded in the mid-1980s by its owner, Andy Ware. The label was based in England and had Roy Harper and Michael Nesmith among its artists.

Artists
 Michael Nesmith
 Roy Harper
 Kurth & Taylor
 James E. Wall
 John Martyn
 Bonzo Dog Band
 The Shadows
 Cindy Lee Berryhill
 Pendragon

See also
 List of record labels

Defunct record labels of the United Kingdom
Folk record labels